Durga Rising is a studio album by the artists Barb Jungr, Kuljit Bhamra and Russell Churney, containing 11 original songs by the trio and 4 covering versions, released in 1997.

Track listing
"The Cutter" (Pete DeFreitas, Ian McCulloch, Les Pattinson, Will Sergeant) – 3:45
Originally from the Echo and the Bunnymen single The Cutter/Way Out and Up We Go (1983) and the Echo and the Bunnymen album Porcupine (1983)
"Still Moving" (Kuljit Bhamra, Barb Jungr) – 3:06
"Choose to be Alone" (Russell Churney, Barb Jungr) – 3:41
"Bombay Dreaming" (Barb Jungr, James Tomalin) – 3:52
"Crimes Against Nature" (Barb Jungr, James Tomalin) – 4:02
"Unchain My Heart" (Freddy James, Agnes Jones) – 3:12
Originally from the Frances Faye album Caught in the Act: At the Thunderbird, Las Vegas (1958)
"Spit It Out" (Barb Jungr, Michael Parker) – 5:40
"Go Down Easy" (John Martyn) – 5:10
Originally from the John Martyn album Solid Air (1973)
"Tears in a Bottle" (Barb Jungr, Parker) – 3:19
"Blind Willie McTell" (Bob Dylan) – 8:48
Originally from the Bob Dylan album The Bootleg Series: Vols 1-3 (1991)
"Train on the Move" (Barb Jungr, James Tomalin) – 6:47

Personnel

Musicians
Barb Jungr - vocals, harmonica, mandolin
Russell Churney - piano, keyboards
Kuljit Bhamra - percussion
James Tomalin - guitar, banjo
Stan Adler - cello

Other personnel
Christoph Bracher - engineer
Mital Mehta - studio assistant
Barb Jungr - design
Dibble - design
Garry Laybourn - photography
Caren Grossman - administration

External links
Barb Jungr
Official website
Russell Churney biography
Russell Churney's Wikipedia entry
Kuljit Bhamra biography
Kuljit Bhamra section of the Keda Records website
James Tomalin biography
James Tomalin's Lime Music website

1997 albums